Mahagauri is the eighth form among the Navadurga aspects of the Hindu mother goddess Mahadevi. She is worshipped on the eighth day of Navaratri. According to Hinduism, Mahagauri has the power to fulfill all the desires of her devotees. The one who worships the goddess, gets relief from all the sufferings in life.

Etymology 
The name Mahagauri translates to extremely bright, clean complexioned, with a shine like the moon. (Mahā, महा = great; Gaurī,  गौरी = bright, clean).

Iconography 
Mahagauri is usually depicted with four hands, the hands holding a trident, fear dispelling gesture, and drum, while the fourth is in a blessing gesture. She rides a white bull, usually shown wearing white clothes. She is one of the peace goddesses.

Legends 

The story of Mahagauri's origins is as follows: The demons Shumbha and Nishumbha could only be killed by a virgin, unmarried form of Parvati. Hence, as advised by Brahma, Shiva repeatedly called Parvati as "Kali" for no reason, in a rather mocking way. Parvati was agitated by this teasing, so she performed severe penance to Brahma so as to get a golden complexion. Brahma explained his inability to grant her a boon and instead requested her to stop her penance and slay the demons Shumbha and Nishumbha. Parvati agreed and went to take a bath in the Ganga river in Himalaya. Parvati entered in the Ganga river and as she took a bath, her dark skin washed off from her person entirely and she came back out as a beautiful golden woman, wearing white garments and apparels, so she gained the epithet "Mahagauri". She then appeared in front of the gods who were praying to her at the Himalayas for the destruction of Shumbha and Nishumbha, and worriedly asked who was being worshipped by them. She then reflected herself as the black Kaushiki Durga and answered her own question saying that the gods were praying to her being defeated by the demons Shumbha and Nishumbha. After absorbing her back,  Parvati then turned black out of pity for the gods and was called Kalika. She then  transformed into Chandi (Chandraghanta) and killed demon Dhumralochan. Chanda and Munda were killed by Goddess Chamunda who appeared out from the third eye of Chandi. Chandi then killed Raktabija and his clones, while Chamunda drank their blood. Parvati turned into Kaushiki again and killed Shumbha and Nishumbha, after which she transformed back into Mahagauri. Hence Parvati killed Shumbha and Nishumbha, giving her the titles of Mahasaraswati or Ambika in the Shiva Purana and the Devi Mahatmya (part of the Markandeya Purana) respectively.

Mounted upon the back of a ox, she rode back home to Kailash, where Mahadev was waiting for her. The two became reunited once again and lived happily with their sons, Kartikeya and Ganesh.

Mother Gauri is Devi, Shakti or the Mother Goddess, who appears in many forms, such as Durga, Parvati, Kali, and others. She is auspicious, brilliant and protects the good people while punishing those who perform evil deeds. Mother Gauri enlightens the spiritual seeker and removes the fear of rebirth by granting salvation.

Prayers

Mantra 
ॐ देवी महागौर्यै नमः॥

Om Devi Mahagauryai Namah॥

References

External links 
 Mahagauri

Navadurgas
Hindu goddesses